The city of Oran in Algeria is divided into eighteen administrative "secteurs urbains" (urban areas). In 1994 twelve areas were established, each with its own administration, overseen by an elected municipal delegate who manages administrative, technical, political and social affairs.(fr) Population growth led to the creation in 2017 of six additional urban areas: Akid Lotfi, Ed-Derb, Fellaoucène, Hammou Boutlélis, El-Khaldia, and Mahieddine.

List of current areas

Historical quarters

El-Hamri
Landmarks include:
 Ahmed Zabana Stadium

Sidi El-Houari
Landmarks include:
 Hassan Pasha Mosque

See also
 Oran Province (French: Wilaya d'Oran), est. 1968, containing the city of Oran(fr)
 Oran (department) (French: Département d'Oran), French administrative area, 1848-1962, containing the city of Oran

References

This article incorporates information from the French Wikipedia.

Bibliography

External links

Oran